Alessio Riccardi (born 3 March 2001) is an Italian professional footballer who plays as a midfielder for  club Latina.

Club career
A product of Roma youth academy, since 2017 he plays for the U19 Primavera team.

He made his debut for Roma's first team on 14 January 2019, aged 17, replacing Lorenzo Pellegrini in the second half of the Coppa Italia match won 4–0 at the Stadio Olimpico against Virtus Entella.

On 8 September 2020, Riccardi joined Serie B side Pescara on loan until 30 June 2021.

On 31 August 2022, after one year as a fringe player at Roma, he has been sold to Latina.

International career
With the Italy U17 he took part in the 2018 UEFA European Under-17 Championship, scoring two goals and reaching the final of the tournament.

Honours 
Italy U17

 UEFA European Under-17 Championship runner-up: 2018

Individual
 UEFA European Under-17 Championship Team of the Tournament: 2018

References

2001 births
Living people
Italian footballers
Italy youth international footballers
Association football midfielders
A.S. Roma players
Delfino Pescara 1936 players
Latina Calcio 1932 players
Serie B players